Azar Ki Ayegi Baraat is a Pakistani comedy-drama from GEO TV.  The show stars  Javed Sheikh, Saba Hameed, Bushra Ansari, Shehryar Zaidi, and Samina Ahmad.  The show was telecast in Pakistan in November 2009.

Plot
Azar (Hassan Niazi) is an orphan and he lives with his wealthy paternal uncle, Shoqat Chaudhary (Shehryar Zaidi) and his uncle's wife Saima Chaudhary (Bushra Ansari) in Faisalabad. Saima is an obscure fashion designer and she is humorously silly. Shoqat and Saima also have a son, Waqar Chaudhary and a daughter, Dolly. Waqar (better known by his nickname Vicky) is studying in London and is secretly married to a Sikh woman, Neetu, over there. In fact, Neetu is expecting. On the other hand, Dolly is a flirt and she is slightly interested in her cousin, Azar, despite the fact that Azar refused to marry her. 
Azar is betrothed to Sila (Sarwat Gilani).

Sila lives in Karachi with her mother, Rabia (Saba Hameed) and her maternal grandmother, Mehr-un-Nisa (Samina Ahmad). Mehr-un-Nisa is the head of her family. Eight years have passed since the separation of Rabia and Sila's father, Faraz Ahmad (Javed Sheikh). Their separation is attributed to misunderstandings, and the sceptical and obstinate nature of Rabia. Rabia and Faraz also have another daughter, Ana who is married and detests her father.

However, Sila is secretly in touch with her father and calls him to attend her marriage against her mother's will. Rabia and Ana are upset to see Faraz at their home, however, Mehr-un-Nisa warmly welcomes him. On the other hand, Waqar arrives in Karachi along with Neetu to attend Azar's marriage. He tells his parents about his marriage when his mother forces him to propose to Laila, Sila's close friend. Faraz and Rabia’s relationship gets more tense, especially after the arrival of Faraz' ex. However, Ana develops a soft corner for her father. Sila gets despondent to realise that her mother's future is gloomy without her father and her parents will never reunite. Sila gets even more despondent when she watches a video in which Azar and Dolly are  sitting closely together in a restaurant. Consequently, she gets reluctant to marry Azar, for she believes that her marriage will end up like that of her parents'. However, Faraz and Rabia’s relationship is rekindled just a day before their daughter's marriage, moreover, during the events of marriage, Dolly gets interested in Nabeel, Sila's friend who was earlier slightly interested in Sila. Finally, Sila happily marries Azar.

Cast
 Javed Sheikh as Faraz Ahmad
 Bushra Ansari as Saima Chaudhary
 Samina Ahmad as Mehr-un-Nisa 
 Saba Hameed as Rabia Ahmad
 Shehryar Zaidi as  Nazeer Ahmed Chaudhary
 Sarwat Gilani as Sila Ahmad/Sila Azar Chaudhary
 Hassan Niazi as Azar Chaudhary
 Sana Askari as Laila ChaudhAry
 Natasha Ali as Dolly Memon
 Uroosa Siddiqui as Sukaina Mela
 Sumbul Shahid as Mushtaq's mother	
 Raheel Butt as Nabeel
 Mehreen Rafi as Ana

Guest Appearance
 Marina Khan as Herself
 Arjumand Rahim as Soniya
 Faisal Qureshi as Himself
 Mahnoor Baloch as Herself
 Imran Abbas as Himself

Broadcast
Due to the popularity of the series, the series was rerun on the network and later on sister channel, Geo Kahani. In India, the show was aired on Zindagi channel in 2015.

References

External links
 

2009 Pakistani television series debuts
2009 Pakistani television series endings
Pakistani comedy television series
Comedy-drama television series
Geo TV original programming
Zee Zindagi original programming